Dragūnas Klaipėda  is a team handball club from Klaipėda, Lithuania. Currently club is competing in Lithuanian Handball League and Baltic Handball League.

Accomplishments

LHL:
 : 2010, 2011, 2014, 2015, 2017, 2018, 2019
Baltic Handball League (BHL) Challenge League:
 : 2015

European record

Team 
  Mindaugas Dumčius
  Edvinas Vorobjovas
  Karolis Stropus
  Jonas Truchanovičius
  Mindaugas Meškauskas
  Igor Kopishinskyi
  Jonas Geryba
  Lukas Jurys
  Šarūnas Ugianskis
  Arvydas Bučius
  Lukas Simėnas
  Gediminas Vaitkus
  Eivydas Račkauskas
  Šarūnas Mičiulis
  Ernestas Lenartavičius
  Benas Vaicekauskas
  Lukas Juškėnas
  Aistis Pažemeckas
  Gytis Rimkus
  Lukas Simanavičius
Coaches
  Artūras Juškėnas
  Rasa Juškėnienė

Links
 Tinklalapis

References 

Lithuanian handball clubs
Sport in Klaipėda
Lithuanian Handball League clubs